Benson Kirk Buffham (November 26, 1919 – April 24, 2019) was an American intelligence official who was Deputy Director of the National Security Agency from 1978 to 1980 during which time he was the highest ranking civilian in the agency.

Biography
He was born November 26, 1919 in Illinois. Buffham joined the Armed Forces Security Agency in 1949 and went on to the newly formed National Security Agency in 1952. In 1955, Buffham was one of the first NSA employees to attend the National War College. With the NSA he had served at the Europe office as Chief of Field Activities as well as various positions in the Production Organization including Deputy Assistant Director for Production. In 1950, he took part in organizing the Inspector General's office. After his deputy directorship, he served in London as the Senior Liaison Officer until he retired in 1980. Buffham died in April 2019 at the age of 99.

References

1919 births
2019 deaths
Deputy Directors of the National Security Agency
People from Illinois
Wesleyan University alumni